The Cascadia national soccer team is a soccer team representing the men's side of the Cascadia region of the United States and Canada and is controlled by the Cascadia Association Football Federation (CAFF). The team is composed of players from the U.S states of Oregon, Washington and the Canadian province of British Columbia. The stated mission of the team is "...to allow Cascadia as a distinct cultural entity, isolated bioregion and growing society with common interests to be represented at the international level in the sport we are all passionate about."  CAFF is a member of ConIFA. Cascadia is not a member of FIFA or any confederation or sub-confederation as the region is wholly a part of both the United States or Canada. However, CAFF is not opposed to those organizations and sees itself coexisting as a non-FIFA regional representative team.

It is hoped that the team will help expose more players from the region to international competition as well as foster a connection between the culture of Cascadia with other regions and peoples around the world. Cascadia participated in the 2018 ConIFA World Football Cup.

History
The idea of a Cascadia representative soccer team existed long before the founder of CAFF and friends first discussed the possibility. People on internet soccer discussion forums discussed the possibility as far back as 2011. In early 2012 an Adidas Cascadia football shirt was designed by Kelly Dews and sold through the Cascadia Trifecta Facebook group to supporters and fans of the three Cascadian MLS teams: Vancouver Whitecaps FC, Seattle Sounders FC, and the Portland Timbers. The first run of these shirts were highly popular and were visible at matches throughout the region.

Following the 2012 London Olympic Games and noting the athletes from Cascadia, former CAFF President Leonard Laymon and others began investigating just what it would take to form a non-FIFA regional representative team. In August 2012 the decision was made to go forward with making such a team a reality and networking was conducted with the non-FIFA football community.

In January 2013 CAFF convened its first general meeting at the headquarters of Golazo Energy in Seattle. At this meeting CAFF's board of directors was elected and its bylaws and team eligibility requirements ratified, by vote. It was also determined in a vote by the CAFF board following the meeting that Cascadia would send a representative to the N.F. Board's Annual General in Munich Germany at the end of the next month. An Indiegogo campaign raised the funding for the application process in less than a week.

In February 2013 Sascha Tillmanns was elected as Cascadia's European representative and initially sent to the meeting to deliver CAFF's application documents, express Cascadia's interest in joining the N.F. Board and help CAFF get an understanding of what its next steps should be. Tillmanns was asked at the meeting to give a presentation on Cascadia which was well received. In early March 2013 Cascadia learned that the N.F. Board would be deciding in the summer to admit up to three new members, of which Cascadia was one. Following this positive news that the early work of looking for Cascadia eligible players and a coach began.

In late April 2013, Alan Koch of Simon Fraser University in Burnaby, BC was the first potential coach to step forward and declare interest in becoming Cascadia's first coach. Later in July 2013 another potential Cascadia coach emerged when in a Q&A session on Twitter, former US men's national team defender and ESPN analyst Alexi Lalas proclaimed that "it would be an honor" to coach Cascadia.

In 2014 Cascadia joined CONIFA under the leadership of then President, Aaron Johnsen.

In June 2018 Cascadia took park in the 2018 CONIFA World Football Cup in London, finishing 6th. CAFF qualified for the tournament by being the only active CONIFA member in North America

Cascadia hosted its first true home match on July 27, 2019, playing a friendly against Darfur at French Field in Kent, Washington. Cascadia won the friendly 8–1.

In October 2019 CAFF made an agreement with the Western Washington Premier League. WWPL became an affiliate league of CAFF, and the two organizations will work together on projects.

International record

CONIFA World Football Cup

Cascadia qualified to participate in the 2018 CONIFA WFC by merit of being the only organization of its kind in North America in good standing with CONIFA. In April, UEFA B license coach James Nichols was brought on to lead the team. Despite an opening day defeat to Ellan Vannin, a 6–0 victory over Tamil Eelam ensured Cascadia's progress to the quarter finals on goal difference. However a defeat to eventual winners Kárpátalja saw Cascadia crash out. A 4–0 win over Western Armenia ensured they would finish in the 5th–6th place playoff, for the best teams knocked out of the quarter finals. Despite coming back from 3 goals down to draw 3–3, Cascadia eventually lost on penalties to early tournament favorites Panjab to finish 6th.

Fixtures and results

2018

2019

2021

Squad

Current squad
The following players were called up to the Cascadia squad for the friendly against  on May 22, 2021.

Recent call-ups

Head coach

Records

Top goal scorers

Kit
 
In early 2012, Kelly Dews designed an Adidas-produced limited run of Cascadia shirts. The kit was white, green and blue with a green sash, reflecting the colors of the Doug Flag.

In August the new design was announced by Kelly Dews and the Cascadia Association Football Federation. It is a horizontal tri-color design similar to that of the flag of Cascadia. It features the CAFF crest on the front and Cascadia on the neckline in the back. The new shirt is made by a local company, Looptworks, but never used.  After Cascadia were announced to feature in the 2018 ConIFA World Football Cup the team announced Stingz Sportswear as their kit supplier and a Giordano sponsorship.

See also
 Canada men's national soccer team
 Non-FIFA international football
 United States men's national soccer team

References

External links

CONIFA member associations
North American N.F.-Board teams
Soccer in British Columbia
Soccer in Oregon
Soccer in Washington (state)